Ruagea membranacea is a species of plant in the family Meliaceae. It is endemic to Ecuador.

References

Flora of Ecuador
membranacea
Vulnerable plants
Taxonomy articles created by Polbot